FEQ may refer to:
Festival d'été de Québec
Freight Elevator Quartet
FEQ, a grade of teak wood